The Ministry of Armed Forces is the ministry of the Government of France in charge of managing the French Armed Forces inside and outside French soil. Its head is the Minister of the Armed Forces. From 1947 until 2017, the Ministry was designated the Ministry of Defence. It is France's ministry of defence.

Organisation

Minister of the Armed Forces
The head of the department is the Minister of the Armed Forces. The current officeholder has been Sébastien Lecornu since 2022. Currently, he reports directly to the President of the Republic, the Commander-in-Chief of the French Armed Forces.

His mission is to organize and manage the country Defense Policy in liaison with other departments. He is also in charge of mobilizing troops and managing the military infrastructure. He is responsible of the French Armed forces security to the Parliament.

Chief of the Defence Staff
The Chief of the Defence Staff (CEMA) reports directly to the Minister. He is in charge of conducting operations, troops training, troops inspection, programming the forces future, and gathering and analyzing Intelligence. He is also in charge of maintaining relationships with other countries.

The position of Chief of the Defence Staff was held by French Army General Pierre de Villiers until 20 July 2017, when he handed his resignation without an official reason. However sources suggest that this was done as a protest against the announced defence budget cuts in contradiction to previous assurances for increased defence spendings. French Army General François Lecointre took over as Chief of Staff of the Armies on the following day.

SGA 
The Secretary General for Administration is in charge of the general administration of the Department. He assists the Minister for:
 Elaborating Budget
 Legal advice
 Human resources policy
 House resources
 Social Management

The position is held by Jean-Paul Bodin.

DGA 
The Direction Générale de l'Armement is the research and development service of the Department. It is in charge of furnishing equipment to all branches of the Armed Forces and creating the future equipment of the armies. The service manages more than 80 projects and commanded more than 7.5 billion euros to the national Industry in 2011.

Headquarters 
The headquarters of the Ministry of the Armies is at the Hotel de Brienne, in the 7th Arrondissement of Paris but all services have been moved to a new headquarters.

On 5 November 2015, French president François Hollande inaugurated The new French Defence Ministry headquarters at Balard Site, nicknamed Hexagone Balard or "Balardgon" in reference to its American counterpart The Pentagon.

Hexagone Balard concentrates all components of the French Armed Forces, and houses the Chief of Staff of the Army, Chief of Staff of the Navy, Chief of Staff of the Air and Space Force, the Direction générale de l'armement, the General Secretary for the Administration and the Chief of the Defence Staff, while the office of the Minister of the Armed Forces stays in the Hotel de Brienne. It is a 250 000 square metres (2690978 Sq Ft) building on a 39.5 acre (16.5 hectares) ground.

 Its nickname "Hexagon" was given to the project because of the shape of the ministry building. The center of the quadrilateral that forms the whole of the West plot consists of two buildings of hexagonal shape.

See also 
Chief of the Defence Staff 
Chief of Staff of the French Army 
Chief of Staff of the French Air and Space Force 
Chief of Staff of the French Navy 
Special Operations Command 
Direction générale de la Gendarmerie Nationale
 DGSE

References 

 
Armies
France